Ronnie Brewer (born March 20, 1985) is an American former professional basketball player. Brewer played collegiately at the University of Arkansas, where his father Ron Brewer was a star in the late 1970s. Brewer is known for having an unorthodox shooting technique, the result of a childhood water slide injury.

The Utah Jazz selected him with the 14th pick of the 2006 NBA draft.

College career
Brewer played at Arkansas from 2003 to 2006 where he averaged 18.4 points, 4.8 rebounds, 3.3 assists, 2.6 steals, and 0.5 blocks. He also was 51–151 from three-point range and shot 75% from the free-throw line.

Professional career

Utah Jazz (2006–2010)
Brewer was selected with the 14th pick in the 2006 NBA draft by the Utah Jazz. Brewer saw very limited playing time in his 2006–07 rookie season with Utah, appearing in only 56 games.  However, after a strong performance in the 2007–08 preseason, he assumed the role of Utah's starting shooting guard. By mid-November 2007, he was averaging double figures in points and was among the NBA leaders in steals. He was later selected to play in the 2008 Rookie-Sophomore Game. On February 28, 2009, Brewer recorded a career-high 26 points, along with 7 rebounds and 4 steals against the Sacramento Kings.

Memphis (2010)
On February 18, 2010, he was traded to the Memphis Grizzlies for a protected future first-round pick. His playing time declined late in the season due to a hamstring injury and the Grizzlies' fading playoff hopes.

Chicago Bulls (2010–2012)
On July 19, 2010, Brewer signed with the Chicago Bulls. In his first season with the Bulls, Brewer played back up shooting guard, averaged 22 minutes per game, and was among the league leaders in defensive efficiency.

On July 10, 2012, the Bulls declined Brewer's option for the next season, along with teammate C.J. Watson's option.

New York Knicks (2012–2013)
On July 25, 2012, Brewer signed with the New York Knicks.

On September 7, 2012, it was announced that Brewer would be out for six weeks after undergoing arthroscopic knee surgery.

Oklahoma City Thunder (2013)
On February 21, 2013, the Oklahoma City Thunder acquired Brewer from the New York Knicks in exchange for a 2014 second-round pick.

Houston Rockets (2013–2014)
On August 28, 2013, Brewer signed with the Houston Rockets. On February 21, 2014, he was waived by the Rockets.

Return to Chicago (2014)
On April 7, 2014, Brewer signed with the Chicago Bulls for the rest of the 2013–14 season. On July 15, 2014, he was waived by the Bulls.

Santa Cruz Warriors (2015–2016)
On October 31, 2015, Brewer was selected by the Santa Cruz Warriors in the second round of the 2015 NBA Development League Draft.

NBA career statistics

Regular season

|-
| align="left" | 
| align="left" | Utah
| 56 || 14 || 12.1 || .528 || .000 || .675 || 1.3 || .4 || .7 || .1 || 4.6
|-
| align="left" | 
| align="left" | Utah
| 76 || 76 || 27.5 || .558 || .220 || .759 || 2.9 || 1.8 || 1.7 || .3 || 12.0
|-
| align="left" | 
| align="left" | Utah
| 81 || 80 || 32.2 || .508 || .259 || .702 || 3.7 || 2.2 || 1.7 || .4 || 13.7
|-
| align="left" | 
| align="left" | Utah
| 53 || 53 || 31.4 || .495 || .258 || .633 || 3.4 || 2.8 || 1.6 || .3 || 9.5
|-
| align="left" | 
| align="left" | Memphis
| 5 || 0 || 16.0 || .231 || .000 || .800 || 1.4 || .6 || 1.2 || .0 || 2.0
|-
| align="left" | 
| align="left" | Chicago
| 81 || 1 || 22.0 || .480 || .222 || .650 || 3.2 || 1.7 || 1.3 || .3 || 6.2
|-
| align="left" | 
| align="left" | Chicago
| 66 || 43 || 24.8 || .427 || .275 || .560 || 3.5 || 2.1 || 1.1 || .3 || 6.9
|-
| align="left" | 
| align="left" | New York
| 46 || 34|| 15.5 || .366 || .310 || .410 || 2.2 || .9 || .7 || .1 || 3.6
|-
| align="left" | 
| align="left" | Oklahoma City
| 14 || 0 || 10.1 || .261 || .200 || .000 || 2.9 || .7 || .6 || .0 || .9
|-
| align="left" | 
| align="left" | Houston
| 23 || 3 || 6.9 || .200 || .125 || .000 || .6 || .4 || .3 || .0 || .3
|-
| align="left" | 
| align="left" | Chicago
| 1 || 0 || 2.0 || .000 || .000 || .000 || .0 || .0 || .0 || .0 || .0
|-
| align="center" colspan="2" | Career
| 502 || 304 || 23.0 || .490 || .254 || .675 || 2.8 || 1.6 || 1.2 || .2 || 7.8

Playoffs

|-
| align="left" | 2007
| align="left" | Utah
| 8 || 0 || 5.1 || .600 || .000 || .538 || .8 || .3 || .1 || .0 || 2.4
|-
| align="left" | 2008
| align="left" | Utah
| 12 || 12 || 25.4 || .520 || .167 || .760 || 3.2 || 1.6 || 1.0 || .3 || 10.2
|-
| align="left" | 2009
| align="left" | Utah
| 5 || 5 || 31.6 || .408 || .000 || .688 || 4.6 || 2.6 || 1.4 || .2 || 10.2
|-
| align="left" | 2011
| align="left" | Chicago
| 16 || 0 || 16.3 || .480 || .429 || .765 || 2.1 || .9 || .8 || .4 || 4.0
|-
| align="left" | 2012
| align="left" | Chicago
| 5 || 0 || 16.6 || .250 || .000 || .000 || 3.8 || 1.8 || .8 || .2 || 1.6
|-
| align="left" | 2013
| align="left" | Oklahoma City
| 1 || 0 || 8.0 || .000 || .000 || .000 || 1.0 || .0 || .0 || .0 || .0
|-
| align="center" colspan="2" | Career
| 47 || 17 || 18.2 || .471 || .267 || .676 || 2.6 || 1.2 || .8 || .3 || 5.6

The Basketball Tournament
Ronnie Brewer played for Team Arkansas in the 2018 edition of The Basketball Tournament. In 2 games, he averaged 8 points, 5 rebounds, and 1.5 blocks per game. Team Arkansas reached the second round before falling to the Talladega Knights.

Recruiting career
On July 20, 2021 Brewer was hired by his alma mater, the University of Arkansas, as the recruiting coordinator for the men's basketball team under head coach Eric Musselman.

Personal life
Brewer is cousins with Detroit rapper Guilty Simpson.

See also
 List of second-generation National Basketball Association players

References

External links

ESPN.com profile

1985 births
Living people
African-American basketball players
American men's basketball players
Arkansas Razorbacks men's basketball players
Basketball players from Arkansas
Basketball players from Portland, Oregon
Chicago Bulls players
Fayetteville High School (Arkansas) alumni
Houston Rockets players
Memphis Grizzlies players
New York Knicks players
Oklahoma City Thunder players
Parade High School All-Americans (boys' basketball)
Santa Cruz Warriors players
Shooting guards
Small forwards
Sportspeople from Fayetteville, Arkansas
Utah Jazz draft picks
Utah Jazz players
21st-century African-American sportspeople
20th-century African-American people